Trinity Hospital may refer to:

in England
 Trinity Hospital, Greenwich, almshouses dated 1613
 Trinity Green Almshouses, almshouses formerly known as Trinity Hospital
 Royal Trinity Hospice, Clapham Common

in Scotland
 Trinity Hospital, or Trinity College Hospital, a medieval almshouse associated with Trinity College Kirk, in Edinburgh, Scotland

in the United States
Trinity Hospital (Little Rock, Arkansas), listed on the NRHP in Arkansas
 Trinity Hospital, run by Trinity Health, a hospital in North Dakota
 University Hospital Summerville, in the Summerville neighborhood of Augusta, Georgia, formerly known as Trinity Hospital

Trauma centers